Ajla Del Ponte (born 15 July 1996) is a Swiss sprinter. She competed in the women's 4 × 100 metres relay event at the 2016 Summer Olympics and at the 2017 World Championships in London. She won the women's 60 metres at the 2021 European Athletics Indoor Championships, doing so in a world leading time and equaling the Swiss record of 7.03 seconds. At the 2020 Summer Olympics she set a new national record for the 100 metres running 10.91 in the heats. On 14 August, she shaved a hundredth of a second off of her record, achieving a time of 10.90 at the 2021 Resisprint International.

International competitions

Personal life  
Her mother, Senada Položanin, was born in Jajce, SR Bosnia and Herzegovina, SFR Yugoslavia, where she worked as a doctor until the Bosnian War broke out. Her father, Claudio Del Ponte, is a cousin of war crimes prosecutor for the International Criminal Tribunal for the former Yugoslavia, Carla Del Ponte.

See also
 2020/21 in 60 metres

References

External links

 

1996 births
Living people
Swiss female sprinters
Swiss people of Bosnia and Herzegovina descent
People from Locarno
Ajla
Athletes (track and field) at the 2016 Summer Olympics
Olympic athletes of Switzerland
Universiade medalists in athletics (track and field)
Universiade gold medalists for Switzerland
Medalists at the 2019 Summer Universiade
Medalists at the 2017 Summer Universiade
European Athletics Indoor Championships winners
Athletes (track and field) at the 2020 Summer Olympics
Olympic female sprinters
Sportspeople from Ticino
21st-century Swiss women